The 1927 Maryland Aggies football team represented the University of Maryland in the 1927 college football season. In their 17th season under head coach Curley Byrd, the Aggies compiled a 4–7 record (3–5 in conference), finished in 15th place in the Southern Conference, and outscored their opponents 186 to 144.

Schedule

References

Maryland
Maryland Terrapins football seasons
Maryland Aggies football